Munches may refer to:
 Munchies (film), 1987 comedy horror film
 Munchies (snack mix), sold by Frito-Lay
 Munchies (confectionery), sold by Nestlé
 A strong desire for food
 In particular, see Effects of cannabis#Appetite
 Snack food
 The Munchies, a 1980s animated public service announcement from the ABC The Bod Squad series
 Munchies, a food website owned by Vice Media